Since its inception, Southwest Airlines has almost exclusively operated Boeing 737 aircraft (except for a brief period when it leased and flew some Boeing 727-200 aircraft). Southwest is the world's largest operator of the Boeing 737, and was the launch customer of the 737-300, 737-500, and 737-700.

The Boeing customer code for Southwest Airlines is H4 for the Classic and Next Gen 737s. For example, the -700 would be 737-7H4, and the -800 would be 737-8H4. These codes do not apply to recent aircraft types, including the 737 MAX 8 and 737 MAX 7.

History

Beginnings
Southwest Airlines began revenue flights on June 18, 1971 using three Boeing 737-200 aircraft, and operated the type exclusively during the airline's early history. These aircraft were not originally ordered by Southwest, but rather were delivery slots taken over from Air California, Aloha Airlines and Pacific Southwest Airlines, including a lone 737-200 Combi which was later traded with a VASP 737-200. After obtaining six aircraft in this manner, Southwest made its first all-new 737 order from Boeing for four aircraft in June 1976. These were also the airline's first 737-200 Advanced series aircraft, with aerodynamic enhancements and greater range than the original 737-200.

In early 2004, Southwest restored and donated the nose section of a retired 737-200, aircraft registration number N102SW, to the Frontiers of Flight Museum at Dallas Love Field. The aircraft had flown for Southwest from March 15, 1984, to January 23, 2004. Southwest retired its last active 737-200 from revenue service on January 17, 2005; however, one 737-200 was retained at Love Field until 2009 as a ground crew training aid.

Southwest operated six Boeing 727-200 aircraft between 1978 and 1985. The first was leased from Braniff International Airways in August 1978 with Braniff providing training and maintenance support. This aircraft was returned in January 1980. In September 1983, Southwest leased two other 727-200 jets from People Express, adding two similar aircraft from the same airline in February 1984. Around this time, Southwest also leased a fifth 727-200 from an unidentified lessor. In September 1985, all five aircraft were returned, and Southwest never again operated the type.

737 Classic era
Southwest was the first airline to operate the Boeing 737-300, which Boeing designed to meet the needs of the airline, as the 737-200 proved to have inadequate range and load-carrying capacity to fly new Southwest routes between Texas and the western United States. The new aircraft had a longer range and seated more passengers than the 737-200, 137 versus 122, and was substantially quieter inside, particularly behind the wing. Most of the 737-300 fleet was later retrofitted with slimmer-profile seats, increasing passenger capacity to 143. Additional 737-300s were obtained from Morris Air when its operations were absorbed by Southwest in 1994. At one time, Southwest operated the largest 737-300 fleet in the world, with 195 aircraft. The first 737-300 to enter service, registration N300SW and manufacturer's serial number (msn) 22940, named "The Spirit of Kitty Hawk", first flew with Southwest on December 17, 1984. N300SW was retired by Southwest in April 2011 after 83,132 flight hours and 77,301 cycles. It has been restored and preserved at the Frontiers of Flight Museum, where it houses a historical exhibit. The last Southwest 737-300 revenue flight took place on September 29, 2017.

Southwest was the launch customer for the Boeing 737-500, a smaller version of the 737-300. Introduced in 1990, the airliner seated 122 passengers—the same as the older 737-200—but had increased fuel capacity and range. The 737-500 was purchased for newly-introduced, long-range routes with lower demand than the airline's established short-haul routes. However, as these routes grew in popularity, the lower seating capacity became a liability, and the 737-500 was shifted mostly to Southwest's original short-haul routes in Texas and its neighboring states. The airline retired its last 737-500 on September 5, 2016.

737 Next Generation era
The airline again became a 737 launch customer when it ordered the first Boeing 737 Next Generation aircraft in November 1993; Southwest took delivery of the first Boeing 737-700 on December 17, 1997. Southwest added the Boeing 737-800 to its fleet on April 11, 2012. The aircraft has 175 seats, 32 more than the former largest 737s in Southwest's fleet.

After completing the purchase of AirTran Airways, Southwest Airlines acquired AirTran's existing fleet of Boeing 717 aircraft. However, Southwest elected not to integrate them into its fleet and currently leases them to Delta Air Lines.

On October 1, 2018, Southwest Airlines took delivery of its final Boeing 737-800. All deliveries for the foreseeable future were expected to be Boeing 737 MAX variants.

737 MAX era
On December 13, 2011, Southwest placed a firm order for 150 Boeing 737 MAX 8 aircraft, becoming the launch customer for the type (although the first delivery of the 737 MAX 8 was to Malindo Air).

On May 15, 2013, Southwest became the launch customer for the Boeing 737 MAX 7. The first delivery was expected in 2019 but was delayed by the grounding of the 737 MAX.

On August 29, 2017, Southwest Airlines took delivery of its first Boeing 737 MAX 8, the first airline in North America to do so. The airline was also the first in North America to operate the aircraft on a scheduled revenue passenger flight on October 1, 2017. By April 2018, Southwest was the largest 737 MAX customer with 280 total orders for the MAX 8 variant, and 310 aircraft total for the 737 MAX family.

On March 13, 2018, Southwest Airlines took delivery of the 10,000th Boeing 737, setting the Guinness World Record for Boeing which started producing the 737 in January 1967. This beat the previous record of 5,000 set back in 2006. This will be flown under tail number N8717M. There is a special registration plate commemorating the milestone inside the L1 door.

In March 2019, countries around the world grounded the Boeing 737 MAX and banned it from flying in their airspace, due to safety concerns following the fatal crash of Ethiopian Airlines Flight 302 and the crash of Lion Air Flight 610 five months prior. When the grounding of all MAX aircraft was extended to the US on March 13, 2019, Southwest Airlines was significantly impacted as the largest operator of the MAX, with 34 grounded aircraft representing 4.5% of its fleet (three airlines tied for second largest with 24 aircraft). On the day of the US grounding order, Southwest Airlines stock dropped more than 4%.

In March 2020, in response to the sharp drop in air travel caused by the COVID-19 pandemic, Southwest indefinitely stored 50 737-700 aircraft at Southern California Logistics Airport. By 28 April, Southwest had indefinitely grounded 350 of its 742 aircraft and delayed many 737 MAX deliveries, a move supported by Boeing because 737 MAX production was shut down due to the continuing MAX groundings.

In November 2020, the FAA formally ended the 737 MAX grounding, and Southwest began the process of returning its 34 737 MAX aircraft to service and retraining all of its pilots. On March 11, 2021, Southwest resumed 737 MAX operation, becoming the fourth US airline to do so.

In October 2020, Southwest announced that it was considering the Airbus A220 as an alternative to the MAX 7 to replace its 737-700s, with deliveries from 2025. However, in March 2021 Southwest announced an order for 100 MAX 7 jets with deliveries from 2022 and said that negotiations with Airbus were never initiated. By June 2021, Southwest converted several MAX 7 options into additional firm orders, anticipating that only MAX 7 aircraft would be delivered during 2022 through 2026. However, in July 2022, Southwest stated that MAX 7 type certification delays would likely postpone the first delivery until 2023 and that the airline would instead receive MAX 8 aircraft in the interim.

Current fleet
, Southwest Airlines operates an all-Boeing 737 fleet, comprising the following aircraft:

Historical fleet

Livery/paint

Southwest's original primary livery was "Desert Gold" (Gold, Red and Orange, with pinstripes of white separating each section of color). The word Southwest appeared in white on the gold portion of the tail. On the original three 737-200s, from June 1971, on the left side of the aircraft, the word Southwest was placed along the upper rear portion of the fuselage, with the word Airlines painted on the tail N21SW. On the right side, the word Southwest was on the tail, but also had the word Airlines painted on the upper rear portion of the fuselage.N20SW. This was later revised to simply include "Southwest" on both sides of the tail. The airline's Boeing 727-200s, operated briefly in the late 1970s and early 1980s, featured other variations on the livery; one was painted in a shade of ochre instead of gold with stylized titles on the forward fuselage and an "S" logo on the tail, while others bore the standard livery (albeit in metallic gold) with the word "Southwest" moved from the tail to the forward fuselage.

Southwest introduced the Canyon Blue livery on January 16, 2001, the first primary livery change in Southwest's then-30-year history. Spirit One was the first aircraft painted in the Canyon Blue fleet color scheme. That aircraft was N793SA, a Boeing 737-700. The second livery replaces the former primary color, "Desert Gold", with "Canyon Blue" and changes the Southwest text and pinstripes to gold. The orange and red stripes continued to be used. The pinstripe along the aircraft was drawn in a more curved pattern instead of the straight horizontal line separating the colors in the original. For aircraft equipped with blended winglets, the blended winglets were painted to include the text Southwest.com. Southwest completed repainting its entire fleet with the new "Canyon Blue" livery in early 2010; however, Classic Retro (N714CB), The Herbert D. Kelleher (N711HK, now retired), and Metallic Gold One (N792SW, the final aircraft delivered from Boeing in the original "Desert Gold" livery that is now repainted into the "Heart" livery), which are Boeing 737-700 aircraft, retained a simplified version of the original "Desert Gold" livery. One Boeing 737-200, registered N96SW was painted into the Canyon Blue livery for unknown reasons.

A new livery, named "Heart" and developed with firms GSD&M, Lippincott, VML, Razorfish, and Camelot Communications, was unveiled on September 8, 2014. The new livery uses a darker shade of blue. The orange stripe on the tail is changed to yellow, and both the red and yellow stripes are now enlarged in reverse pattern. The belly of the aircraft is now in blue, and it features a heart, which has been a symbol for Southwest during its 43-year history. Additionally, the pinstripes are changed to a silver-gray. The Southwest text, now white, has been moved to the front of the fuselage. The lettering is in a custom font designed by Monotype, Southwest Sans. The web address was moved from the winglets to the engines. The dot in Southwest.com is now the new Heart logo featured on the belly of the aircraft.

Special liveries and decals 
Some Southwest Airlines aircraft feature special liveries or are named with special decals. Southwest gives these aircraft special names, usually ending in "One." All special liveries painted prior to Spirit One originally wore the standard Desert Gold, red and orange colors on the vertical stabilizer and rudder. Subsequent special liveries featured tails painted with the "Canyon Blue" livery, with all earlier specials repainted with the Spirit One livery tail. Any aircraft painted in special liveries will have their winglets painted white. Missouri One was the first special livery to feature a modified version of the "Heart" tail design, with the red and yellow ribbons shrunk in order to fit the Southwest wordmark as it cannot fit on the fuselage like on the other aircraft. Previous special livery aircraft are currently being repainted with the new "Heart" tail design.

Southwest Airlines' Current and Former Special Liveries

Notes

See also
Alaska Airlines fleet
Delta Air Lines fleet
American Airlines fleet
United Airlines fleet

References

Southwest Airlines
Lists of aircraft by operator